Aureoboletus russellii, commonly known as Russell's bolete, is a species of bolete fungus in the family Boletaceae. An edible species, it is found in Asia and eastern North America, where it grows in a mycorrhizal association with oak, hemlock, and pine trees. Fruit bodies of the fungus are characterized by their coarsely shaggy stem. The yellow-brown to reddish-brown caps are initially velvety, but become cracked into patches with age.

Taxonomy 
Originally named Boletus russellii by Charles Christopher Frost in 1878 from collections made in New England, the species was transferred to Boletellus by Edouard-Jean Gilbert in 1931. It was then transferred to Aureoboletus by Gang Wu and Zhu L. Yang in 2016. The specific epithet russellii honors American botanist and Unitarian  minister John Lewis Russell, the first collector of the species.  Common names given to the mushroom include shagnet, jagged-stem bolete, and Russell's bolete.

 Description 
The cap surface is initially velvety, with a margin rolled inward, but after maturing the cap becomes cracked and forms scale-like patches. The color is yellow-brown to reddish-brown to olive-gray, while the flesh is pale yellow to yellow. The pore surface is yellow to greenish yellow; when the pore surface is rubbed or injured it will turn a brighter yellow color. Reddish brown to pinkish tan in color, the stem is solid (i.e., not hollow or stuffed with a pith), sometimes curved, and sticky at the base when moist. The surface texture is characterized by deep grooves and ridges, with the ridges torn and branched so as to appear shaggy. Aureoboletus russellii has neither a partial veil nor a ring. Fruit bodies are edible, but are "soft and insipid" and not particularly sought after by mushroom hunters.

The spore print is olive brown. The spores are ellipsoid, measuring 15–20 by 7–11 μm. Similar to the reticulation of the stem, the spore surfaces have deep longitudinal grooves and furrows, sometimes with a cleft in the wall at the top of the spore.

Similar speciesAureoboletus betula is somewhat similar in stature and also has a deeply reticulate stem, but can be distinguished by its smooth, shinier cap and spores with pits.

 Habitat and distribution Aureoboletus russellii'' is known from eastern North America, where it grows singly or scattered on the ground in association with oak, hemlock, and pine trees. The geographic range extends from eastern Canada south to Central America, and west to Michigan and southern Arizona. It is also found in Asia, including Korea and Taiwan.

See also
List of North American boletes

References 

Edible fungi
Fungi of Asia
Fungi of Central America
Fungi of North America
Fungi described in 1878